The Elswick Ordnance Company (sometimes referred to as Elswick Ordnance Works, but usually as "EOC") was a British armaments manufacturing company of the late 19th and early 20th century

History
Originally created in 1859 to separate William Armstrong's armaments business from his other business interests, to avoid a conflict of interest as Armstrong was then Engineer of Rifled Ordnance for the War Office and the company's main customer was the British Government. Armstrong held no financial interest in the company until 1864 when he left Government service, and Elswick Ordnance was re-united with the main Armstrong businesses to form Sir W.G. Armstrong & Company. EOC was then the armaments branch of W.G. Armstrong & Company and later of Armstrong Whitworth.

EOC's main customer in its early years was the British Government, but the Government abandoned "Armstrong guns" in the mid-1860s due to dissatisfaction with Armstrong's breech mechanism, and instead built its own rifled muzzle-loaders at Woolwich Arsenal ("Woolwich guns") until 1880. This forced EOC to survive on export orders for both muzzle-loaders and breech-loaders until the 1880s when the British Government again began buying guns from EOC, this time rifled breech-loaders with more robust interrupted screw breech mechanisms such as the de Bange system and its successors.

Elswick Ordnance was a major arms developer before and during World War I. The ordnance and ammunition it manufactured for the British Government were stamped EOC, while guns made for export were usually marked "W.G. Armstrong".

See also
J.R. Perrett

Bibliography

External links

http://oldbritishguns.com/elswick-ordnance-co

 
Defence companies of the United Kingdom
Scotswood